Manuel Muñoz is a Spanish sprint canoer who competed in the early 2000s. He won a silver (K-4 200 m: 2002) and two bronze (K-4 200 m: 2003, K-4 500 m: 2002) medals at the ICF Canoe Sprint World Championships.

References 

Living people
Spanish male canoeists
Year of birth missing (living people)
ICF Canoe Sprint World Championships medalists in kayak